John or Jack Norris may refer to:

Politicians
John Norris (died 1577), MP for Downton, Taunton and Bodmin
John Norris (1685–1752), Member of Parliament for Chippenham, 1713–1715
John Norris (1702–1767), Member of Parliament for Rye, 1727–1733
John Norris (born 1740), Member of Parliament for Rye, 1762–1774
Sir John Norris (Royal Navy officer) (1670/71–1749), British admiral, Member of Parliament for Rye and Portsmouth
John Thomas Norris (1808–1870), MP for Abingdon, 1857–1865
John Norris (1721–1786), High Sheriff of Buckinghamshire

Others
John Norris (soldier) or Norreys (ca. 1547 – 1597), the son of Henry Norris, 1st Baron Norreys, a lifelong friend of Queen Elizabeth
John Norris (philosopher) (1657–1711), philosopher and poet
John Norris (1721–1786), English merchant and member of the Hellfire Club
John S. Norris (1804–1876), American architect
John Norris (priest) (1823–1891), English archdeacon
J. Frank Norris (John Franklyn Norris, 1877–1952), American fundamentalist preacher
John Norris (publisher) (1934–2010), Canadian publisher, editor, music critic, and record producer
Jack Norris (ice hockey) (born 1942), ice hockey player
John Norris (reporter) (born 1959), MTV News correspondent
Jack Norris (activist) (born 1967), American dietitian and animal rights activist

See also 
John Norreys (disambiguation)